See also The Great Santini (film)

The Death of Santini: The Story of a Father and His Son is a 2013 memoir written by Pat Conroy.  It complements the 1976 novel The Great Santini which was adapted into a 1979 film of the same name.

Overview  
Conroy writes a memoir of his love/hate relationship with his father, his father's abuse, and the transient life of the families of American military personnel.

References

2013 non-fiction books
American memoirs
Books by Pat Conroy
English-language books
Random House books